Maulvi Mohammad Ishaq Akhundzada is an Afghan Taliban politician who is currently serving as Governor of Ghazni Province since 7 November 2021.

References

Living people
Taliban governors
Governors of Ghazni Province
Year of birth missing (living people)